There are around 1,000 listed buildings in Cardiff, the capital city of Wales. A listed building is one considered to be of special architectural, historical or cultural significance, which is protected from being demolished, extended or altered, unless special permission is granted by the relevant planning authorities. The Welsh Government makes decisions on individual cases, taking advice from the heritage agency Cadw, the Royal Commission on the Ancient and Historical Monuments of Wales and local councils.

Key

Because of the way in which buildings are listed and the large number of listed buildings within the city, they have been subdivided into Grade I, II* and II buildings, with the Grade II buildings being further split up by area.

Grade I listed buildings

|}

Grade II* listed buildings  

|}

Grade II listed buildings

Adamsdown

Butetown and Cardiff Bay

Caerau

|}

Canton

City centre

Cathays

Cyncoed

Ely

|}

Fairwater

Flat Holm (Island)

Gabalfa

Grangetown

Heath

Lisvane

Llandaff

Llandaff North

|}

Llanishen

Morganstown

Pentyrch

Penylan

Pontprennau

|}

Radyr

Rhiwbina

|}

Riverside

Roath

Rumney

St Fagans

St Mellons

Splott

Tongwynlais

Trowbridge

Whitchurch

See also
 Architecture of Cardiff
 List of Scheduled Monuments in Cardiff
 Listed buildings in Wales

Notes

Sources
 Cardiff, Wales, BritishListedBuildings.co.uk

References

External links

 Listed and Locally Listed Buildings, Cardiff Council.
 Interactive map showing the locations of listed buildings – Cardiff Council

 
Cardiff-related lists
Cardiff
Cardiff